John Spilsbury (/I.P.A. spɪlsbəri/ 1739 – 3 April 1769) was a British cartographer and engraver. He is credited as the inventor of the jigsaw puzzle. Spilsbury created them for educational purposes, and called them "Dissected Maps".

Life and works 

John Spilsbury was the second of three sons of Thomas Spilsbury; the engraver Jonathan Spilsbury was his elder brother, and the two have sometimes been confused. He served as an apprentice to Thomas Jefferys, the Royal Geographer to King George III.

Spilsbury created the first puzzle in 1766 as an educational tool to teach geography. He affixed a world map to wood and carved each country out to create the first puzzle. Sensing a business opportunity, he created puzzles on eight themes - the World, Europe, Asia, Africa, America, England and Wales, Ireland, and Scotland.

Spilsbury married Sarah May of Newmarket, Suffolk in 1761. After his death she ran his business for a period, then married Harry Ashby who had been apprentice to Spilsbury, and who continued to sell puzzles.

References

External links 

 John Spilsbury at the National Portrait Gallery
 Jigsaw puzzle, 1766

1739 births
1769 deaths
18th-century engravers
British engravers
British inventors
English cartographers
Puzzle designers
18th-century cartographers